Waja (also known as Nyan Wiyau, Wiyaa, or Wuya) is a Savannas language of eastern Nigeria. Dialectical differences between Deruwo (Wajan Dutse) and Waja proper (Wajan Kasa) are slight.

Dialects
Waja dialects:

Wɩyáà (Wajan Kasa), spoken in ten settlements, including Talasse (main settlement that is home to the Emir of Waja).
Derúwò (Hill Waja or Wajan Dutse), spoken in Deri. There are two varieties:
Putoki, Kulani, and Degri
Sikkam and Degri

References

Waja languages
Languages of Nigeria